Weeford is a village and civil parish in the Lichfield district of Staffordshire, England. According to the 2011 Census, the parish had a population of 215, an increase from 202 in the 2001 Census.

The name Weeford is believed to come from the Old English Wēohford or Wēoford, and to mean "Holy ford", or "ford by a heathen temple".

The medieval church is dedicated to St Mary the Virgin, and listed Grade II. It was rebuilt to its present form in 1802, to a design by James Wyatt. Wyatt had himself been born at Blackbrook Farm in Weeford in 1746, and by 1802 had already designed such buildings as the Radcliffe Observatory, Oxford and Broadway Tower, Worcestershire.

Manley Hall (also known as Thickbroom Hall) was an English Tudor-style country house which at one time stood in a 1200-acre estate on the western outskirts of the village.

See also
Listed buildings in Weeford

References

External links

 Official church web site

Villages in Staffordshire
Lichfield District
Civil parishes in Staffordshire